Homeobox expressed in ES cells 1, also known as homeobox protein ANF, is a homeobox protein that in humans is encoded by the HESX1 gene.

Expression of HEX1 and HESX1 marks the anterior visceral endoderm of the embryo. The AVE is an extra-embryonic tissue, key to the establishment of the anterior-posterior body axis.

Clinical significance 

Mutations in the HESX1 gene are associated with some cases of septo-optic dysplasia or Pickardt-Fahlbusch syndrome.

References

Further reading

External links
  GeneReviews/NCBI/NIH/UW entry on Anophthalmia / Microphthalmia Overview
 

Transcription factors